Guy Lagorce (born 12 January 1937) in La Bachellerie (Dordogne) is a French journalist and writer, winner of the 1984 prix des libraires.

Biography 
Guy Lagorce is a former French sprint international athlete (100m, 200m and member of the French team. He improved the national record of the 4 × 100 m in 1961 at Thonon with Genevay, Piquemal and Delecour in 39'9 and that of Europe in the 4 X 200m also in 1961 with the same compatriots sprinters. He has 13 team selections from France.

He then became a sports journalist and chief editor at L'Équipe, TF1, Le Figaro, Paris Match and L'Express.

In addition, as a writer, several films and TV films have been made on television and in films from his books, in particular by Jacques Ertaud and Yves Boisset.

Work 
1975: Noblesse du sport, cowritten with Robert Parienté, illustrations by André Dunoyer de Segonzac and André Planson
1976: Ne pleure pas, Éditions Grasset,  — Prix Maison de la Presse
1977: La Vitesse du vent, Éditions Julliard,  
1979: Marie en plein soleil, France Loisir,  
1980: La Raison des fous, Grasset, 
1980: Les Héroïques, Éditions Gallimard,  — Prix Goncourt de la nouvelle and prix Cazes
1981: Les Carnassiers, Grasset, 
1983: Le Train du soir, Grasset,   — Prix des libraires
1985: Rue des Victoires, Grasset,  
1988: Fin de soirée, Grasset,  
1992: Les Dieux provisoires, JC Lattès, 
1994: Du vent sous la peau, JC Lattès,  
1995: Peinture fraîche, JC Lattès, 
1997: La Fine Équipe, JC Lattè, 
1999: Quelqu'un de bien, Plon,

External links 
 Guy Lagorce on Babelio
 Guy Lagorce on Radioscopie (22 June 1978)
 Guy Lagorce on Who's Who?
 Guy Lagorce on Bibliopoche
 Articles by Guy Lagorce on L'Express

French sports journalists
20th-century French writers
French male sprinters
Prix Goncourt de la nouvelle recipients
Prix des libraires winners
Prix Maison de la Presse winners
1937 births
Sportspeople from Dordogne
Living people
Universiade bronze medalists for France
Universiade medalists in athletics (track and field)
Medalists at the 1959 Summer Universiade
Le Figaro people